Sergei Chernyshov may refer to:
 Sergei Chernyshov (footballer, born 1984), Russian association football player
 Sergey Chernyshev (footballer) (born 1990), Russian-Azerbaijani association football player
 Sergei Chernyshev (breakdancer) (born 2000), Russian breakdancer